Walter Brack (November 20, 1880 – July 19, 1919) was a German backstroke and breaststroke swimmer who competed in the 1904 Summer Olympics.

In the 1904 Olympics he won a gold medal in the 100 yard backstroke and a silver medal in the Men's 440 yard breastroke. He was born and died in Berlin.

See also
 List of members of the International Swimming Hall of Fame

References

External links
profile

1880 births
1919 deaths
Swimmers from Berlin
German male swimmers
Olympic gold medalists for Germany
Olympic silver medalists for Germany
Olympic swimmers of Germany
Swimmers at the 1904 Summer Olympics
Medalists at the 1904 Summer Olympics
Male backstroke swimmers
German male breaststroke swimmers
Olympic gold medalists in swimming
Olympic silver medalists in swimming